Kenneth William Granger (born 20 March 1951) is a former New Zealand rugby union player. A wing three-quarter, Granger represented  at a provincial level between 1971 and 1984, playing 128 matches and scoring 66 tries. He was a member of the New Zealand national side, the All Blacks, on their 1976 tour of South America. He scored five tries in his six matches on that tour, including the international against Uruguay for which the New Zealand Rugby Union did not award test caps.

References

1951 births
Living people
Rugby union players from Wellington City
People educated at Queen Charlotte College
People educated at Freyberg High School
New Zealand international rugby union players
Manawatu rugby union players
New Zealand rugby union players
Harlequin F.C. players
New Zealand expatriate sportspeople in England
Expatriate rugby union players in England
Rugby union wings